Old Rhodes Key is an island north of the upper Florida Keys in Biscayne National Park.  It is in Miami-Dade County, Florida.

It is located just north of Broad Creek in the lower part of Biscayne Bay.

History
Some of the earlier names for this island may have been "Old Road", "Jenyns Island", "Jenning's Island" and "Jenkyns".

References

Islands of the Florida Keys
Uninhabited islands of Miami-Dade County, Florida
Biscayne National Park
Islands of Florida